Before the Pleistocene Ice Age, circa two million years before present (YBP), the rivers in North, South Dakota and eastern Montana drained northeast into Canada and then into Hudson Bay. The Keewatin Lobe of the continental ice sheet, block the flow of water northward and impounded it along the ice front.  Lakes formed, until the waters could find a new way to drain.  Initially, the north flowing rivers followed the front of the glacier eastward and into a valley that passed between Garrison and Riverdale, to the Turtle Lake area, and on into Sheridan County. This is known as the preglacial McClean River. This valley became blocked by the glacier and the glacial lake identified as Lake McKenzie formed. Eventually, water level rose to crest the south ridge a point near Riverdale — at the site of the modern Garrison Dam and a diversion trench was cut. The modern Missouri River follows this pathway.

See also
List of prehistoric lakes
Proglacial lakes of the Missouri River Basin
Lake Cut Bank
Lake Chouteau
Lake Great Falls
Lake Musselshell
Lake Jordan.
Lake Circle
Lake Glendive
Lake McKenzie

References

Bibliography
Alden, W. C., 1958, Physiography And Glacial Geology Of Eastern Montana And Adjacent Areas, U. S. Geological Survey Professional Paper 174.
Colton, R. B., Lemke, R. W., and Lindvall, R. M., 1961, Glacial map of Montana East of the Rocky Mountains, U. S. Geological Survey Miscellaneous Geological Investigations Map I-327.
Howard, A. D., 1958, Drainage Evolution In Northeastern Montana and Northwestern North Dakota, Bulletin of the Geological Society of America, v69, 575-588.
Lemke, R. W., Laird, W. M., Tipton, M. J., and Lindvall, R. M., 1965, Quaternary Geology Of Northern Great Plains, in Wright, H. E., Jr., and Frey, D. G., Eds, The Quaternary of the United States, Princeton University Press, Princeton, NJ.
Lindvall, R. M., 1962, Geology Of The Eagle Buttes Quadrangle, Chouteau County, Montana, U. S. Geological Survey Miscellaneous Geological Investigations Map I-349.
Thornbury, W. D., 1965, Regional Geomorphology Of The United States, John Wiley & Sons, Inc., New York.
Trimble, D. E., 1980, The Geologic Story Of The Great Plains, Geological Survey Bulletin 1493.
Wayne, W. J., Aber, J. S., Agard, S. S., Bergantino, R. N., Bluemle, J. P., Coates, D. A., Cooley, M. E., Madole, R. F., Martin, J. E., Mears, B., Jr., Morrison, R. B., and Sutherland, W. M., 1991, Quaternary Geology Of The Northern Great Plains, in The Geology of North America, Vol K-2, Quaternary Nonglacial Geology: Conterminous U. S., The Geological Society of America.

Former lakes of the United States
Geology of North Dakota
Glacial lakes of the United States
Natural history of North Dakota
Proglacial lakes